The Japan Men's Under-19 National Floorball Team is the men's under-19 national floorball team of Japan, and a member of the International Floorball Federation. The team is composed of the best Japanese floorball players under the age of 19. The Japan under-19 men's team is currently ranked 15th in the world at floorball, and played in the B-Division at the most recent U-19 World Floorball Championships.

The team is currently prepping for the 2021 U-19 World Floorball Championships, which will be in Brno, Czech Republic.

Roster 
As of June 27, 2019

Team Staff 
Head Coach - Soichi Kato 

Team Official - Kaoru Wakasa 

Team Official - Akihiro Sawada 

Team Official - Ned Milburn 

Team Official - Maki Milburn

Records

All-Time World Championship Records

Head-to-Head International Records

References 

Floorball in Japan
Floorball